The Cabinet of the Governor of New Mexico is a body of the most senior appointed officials of the executive branch of the government of New Mexico.

The executive leaders of the agencies below are subject to confirmation by the New Mexico Senate.

Cabinet departments

References

See also

 Government of New Mexico

Government of New Mexico